The List of shipwrecks in the 1750s includes some ships sunk, wrecked or otherwise lost during the 1750s.

1750

1751

1752

1753

1754

May
Unknown date

September
2 September

October
14 October

December
Unknown date

Unknown date

1755

1756

January
22 February

October
31 October

November
Unknown date

December
11 December

Unknown date

1757

1758

1759

April
19 April

July
3 July

August
19 August

September
12 September

25 September

October
24 October

November
18 November

20 November

21 November 

Unknown date

December
4 December

5 December

13 December

29 December

31 December

Unknown date

Unknown date

References

1750s
Maritime incidents in 1750
Maritime incidents in 1751
Maritime incidents in 1752
Maritime incidents in 1753
 
Maritime incidents in 1755
 
Maritime incidents in 1757
Maritime incidents in 1758